Amy Allen (born 1976) is an American actress.

Amy Allen or Aimee Allen may also refer to:

Amy Allen (philosopher)
Amy Allen (songwriter)
Aimee Allen (born 1982), American singer-songwriter
Amy Allen (The A Team)
Amy Allen, a swimmer in the 2010 Oceania Swimming Championships
Amy Allen, a superhero known as Bombshell (DC Comics)